The following radio stations broadcast on AM frequency 870 kHz: 870 AM is a United States clear-channel frequency. WWL in New Orleans, Louisiana is the dominant Class A station on 870 kHz.

In Argentina 
 LRA1 Nacional in Buenos Aires.
 LRA40 Futbol in Buenos Aires.

In Canada

In Mexico 
 XEACC-AM in Puerto Escondido, Oaxaca
 XEGRO-AM in Chilpancingo, Guerrero
 XETAR-AM in Guachochi, Chihuahua

In the United States 
Stations in bold are clear-channel stations.

References

Lists of radio stations by frequency